Qotb al-Zaman Muhammad Abu Tahir Marwazi was a 12th-century prominent Persian philosopher from Khwarezmia. He died in Sarakhs in Iran in 1144CE.

See also

List of Iranian scientists

1144 deaths
12th-century Iranian philosophers
Year of birth unknown
People from Merv